Michael F. Flaherty Sr. (born September 6, 1936) is a former member of the Massachusetts House of Representatives and former associate justice of the Boston Municipal Court. A South Boston Democrat, he represented the 4th Suffolk district from 1967 to 1991. He was appointed to the Boston Municipal Court by Governor Jane M. Swift in July 2001, and retired in 2006. He is a former attorney who graduated from Boston College and the New England School of Law. He is the father of Michael F. Flaherty, a former Boston City Council president.

References
 Public officers of the Commonwealth of Massachusetts (1989–1990). Massachusetts General Court. p. 131.
 "Mass. lawmakers bracing for battle over court budget." The Boston Globe. May 15, 2002.

Democratic Party members of the Massachusetts House of Representatives
Massachusetts state court judges
Boston College alumni
New England Law Boston alumni
1936 births
Living people
Lawyers from Boston